George Park is a  public park in Portland, Oregon's St. Johns neighborhood, in the United States. Acquired in 1971, the park is named after Melvin Clark George.

References

1971 establishments in Oregon
Parks in Portland, Oregon
Protected areas established in 1971
St. Johns, Portland, Oregon